Guido Vecchiola Arellano (born November 16, 1973, Chañaral), is a popular Chilean actor in soap opera and film. He is of Italian and Basque descent.

Vecchiola was born in Chañaral and has two brothers. In 1993, GVecchiola joined the dramatic area staff of the Chilean TV channel UCTV. He was best known for his role in the show called Carabineros de Chile (1992). His television debut was in Champaña at 19 years old, and he later worked in El Amor está de Moda, Amor a Domicilio, Adrenalina, Eclipse de Luna, Amándote, Fuera de Control and Sabor a Tí. Later, Vecchiola took a break to live in Europa for three years, returning in 2003 to work in soap operas like Xfea2, Brujas, Descarado and Lola, and cinema in the film El Huésped directed by Jorge Hidalgo.

In 2007, Vecchiola was a contestant in the TV show Locos por el Baile, taking third place after Fabricio Vasconcelos and Catalina Pulido.

Soap operas 
 1994 – Champaña (Canal 13) - Greg Brandao
 1995 – El amor está de moda (Canal 13) - Jorge
 1995 – Amor a Domicilio (Canal 13) - Matías Undurraga
 1996 – Adrenalina (Canal 13) - Fabián Undurraga
 1997 – Eclipse de Luna (Canal 13) - Diego Landa
 1998 – Amándote (Canal 13) - Nicolás Urrutia
 1999 – Fuera de Control (Canal 13) - Santiago Goic
 2000 – Sabor a Tí  (Canal 13) - Julián Solano
 2004 – Xfea2  (MEGA)- Aquiles Carranza
 2005 – Brujas  (Canal 13) - Benjamín Rivas
 2006 – Descarado  (Canal 13) - Daniel Arredondo
 2007/2008 – Lola  (Canal 13) - Gonzalo Castro
 2010 – Mujeres de Lujo (chilevisión) - Max Larrazabal

Movies 
 2005 – El Huésped - Jean Franco Bruzzone

Series, miniseries and TV 
 1996 – Amor a Domicilio, la comedia (Canal 13)
 2003 – La Vida es una Lotería (TVN) - Alberto
 2004/2005/2008/2009 – Teatro en Chilevisión (CHV)
 2006 – Casado con Hijos (MEGA) - Helmut

Theatre 
 2004 – Se busca impotente para convivir
 2005/2006 – El cuando quiere, Ellas cuando pueden
 2007 – El Virus
 2007 – Costalazo
 2008/2009 – Tape
 2009 – Conmigo no cuenten
 2010 – Toc-Toc
 2010 - " En la cama"
 2012 - " Toc-Toc"

References

External links

Chilean male telenovela actors
Chilean male film actors
Living people
1973 births
Chilean people of Italian descent
Chilean male stage actors
20th-century Chilean male actors
21st-century Chilean male actors